Laramie County School District #1 is a public school district based in Cheyenne, Wyoming, United States. With an enrollment of 12,933 students as of October 1, 2008, it is the largest school district in the state of Wyoming.

Geography
Laramie County School District #1 serves the western portion of Laramie County, including the following communities

Incorporated places
City of Cheyenne
Census-designated places (Note: All census-designated places are unincorporated.)
Fox Farm-College
Ranchettes
South Greeley
Warren AFB
Unincorporated places
Granite
Horse Creek

Schools

High schools
Grades 9-12
East High School
South High School
Central High School
Poder Academy Secondary School (Charter school)
Grades 9-12
Triumph High School (Alternative)

Junior high schools
Grades 7-8
Mccormick Junior High School
Johnson Junior High School
Carey Junior High School
Poder Academy Secondary School (Charter School)

Elementary schools
Grades 4-6
Miller Elementary School
Grades 3-6
Fairview Elementary School
Grades K-6
Afflerbach Elementary School
Alta Vista Elementary School
Anderson Elementary School
Arp Elementary School
Baggs Elementary School
Bain Elementary School
Buffalo Ridge Elementary School
Clawson Elementary School
Cole Elementary School
Davis Elementary School (Currently under renovation, students/staff in Eastridge complex)
Dildine Elementary School
Freedom Elementary School
Gilchrist Elementary School
Goins Elementary School
Hebard Elementary School
Henderson Elementary School
Hobbs Elementary School
Jessup Elementary School
Pioneer Park Elementary School
Poder Academy (Charter School - K-5)
Prairie Wind Elementary School
Rossman Elementary School
Saddle Ridge Elementary School
Sunrise Elementary School
Willadsen Elementary School
Grades K-3
Deming Elementary School
Grades K-2
Lebhart Elementary School

Student demographics
The following figures are as of Fall 2010

Total District Enrollment: 13,170
Student enrollment by gender
Male: Not Listed or Unknown
Female: Not Listed or Unknown
Student enrollment by ethnicity
White (not Hispanic): 72.48%
Hispanic: 19.61%
Black (not Hispanic): 2.64%
Asian or Pacific Islander: 0.86%
American Indian or Alaskan Native: 0.57%

See also
List of school districts in Wyoming

References

External links
Laramie County School District #1 – official site.

Education in Laramie County, Wyoming
Cheyenne, Wyoming
School districts in Wyoming